Thomas Singleton may refer to:

 Thomas Singleton (academic) (1552–1614), Vice-Chancellor of the University of Oxford
 Thomas Singleton (priest) (1783–1842), Archdeacon of Northumberland
 Thomas D. Singleton (died 1833), US Representative from South Carolina
 Tommy Singleton (1940–2005), English footballer